Shlomo ben Avraham ibn Aderet ( or Solomon son of Abraham son of Aderet) (1235 – 1310) was a medieval rabbi, halakhist, and Talmudist. He is widely known as the Rashba, the Hebrew acronym of his title and name: Rabbi Shlomo ben Avraham.

Aderet was born in Barcelona, Crown of Aragon, in 1235. He became a successful banker and leader of Spanish Jewry of his time. As a rabbinical authority his fame was such that he was designated as El Rab d'España ("The Rabbi of Spain"). He served as rabbi of the Main Synagogue of Barcelona for 50 years.  He died in 1310.

Biography
Aderet's teachers were Nahmanides and Yonah Gerondi. He was a master in the study of the Talmud, and was not opposed to the Kabbala. Aderet was very active as a rabbi and as an author. Under his auspices and through his recommendation, part of the commentary on the Mishnah by Maimonides was translated from the Arabic into Hebrew. His Talmudic lectures were attended by throngs of disciples, many of whom came from distant places. Questions in great number, dealing with ritual, with the most varied topics of the Halakah, and with religious philosophy, were addressed to him from Spain, Portugal, Italy, France, Germany, and even from Asia Minor. His responsa show evidence of wide reading, keen intelligence, and systematic thought. They also afford a clear insight into the communal life of the time, portraying Aderet's contemporaries, and are of value for the study not only of rabbinical procedure but also of the intellectual development of the age in which he lived. Only half of these responsa have been published, as they number three thousand.

Among his numerous students were Yom Tov Asevilli and Bahya ben Asher.

A manuscript purporting to be a certificate of indebtedness, dated 1262, in favor of a certain Solomon Adret, Jew of Barcelona, and a passport for the same Adret, dated 1269, are still extant.

Defense of Judaism
Aderet had to contend with the external enemies of Judaism, as well as with religious dissensions and excesses within its own ranks. He wrote a refutation of the charges of Raymond Martini, a Dominican friar of Barcelona, who, in his work, "Pugio Fidei," had collected passages from the Talmud and the Midrash and interpreted them in a manner hostile to Judaism. These charges also induced Aderet to write a commentary on the Haggadot, of which only a fragment is now extant. He refuted also the attacks of a Muslim who asserted that the priests had falsified the Bible. M. Schreiner has shown that this Muslim was Aḥmad ibn Ḥazm, and the book referred to was "Al-Milal wal-Niḥal" (Religions and Sects).

Aderet opposed also the increasing extravagances of the Kabbalists, who made great headway in Spain and were represented by Nissim ben Abraham of Avila, a pretended worker of miracles, and by Abraham Abulafia, the kabbalistic visionary. He combated these with vigor, but displayed no less animosity toward the philosophic-rationalistic conception of Judaism then prevailing, particularly in France, which was represented by Levi ben Abraham ben Ḥayyim, who treated most important religious questions with the utmost freedom, and who was joined by the Spaniard Isaac Albalag and others.

Aderet and Abba Mari
Opposed to these was another tendency, the chief object of which was the preservation of the pure faith of Judaism. At the head of this movement stood Abba Mari ben Moses ha-Yarḥi. He appealed to Aderet for assistance. An extensive correspondence ensued between the authorities of southern France and northern Spain, Aderet taking a most important part. Afterward this correspondence was collected and published by Abba Mari, in a separate work, entitled "Minḥat Ḳenaot".

Aderet, whose disposition was peaceable, at first endeavored to conciliate the opposing spirits. Ultimately he was called upon to decide the affair, and on July 26, 1305, together with his colleagues of the rabbinate of Barcelona, he pronounced the ban of excommunication (ḥerem) over all who studied physics or metaphysics before the completion of their thirtieth year. A protest against this ban may be found in a poem in which Philosophy "calls out in a loud voice against . . . Solomon ben Adret and against all the rabbis of France . . . who have placed under the ban all people who approach her". Those who desired to study medicine as a profession were exempted from the ban. A special ban was pronounced against the rationalistic Bible exegetes and the philosophic Haggadah commentators, their writings and their adherents. The enforcing of these bans caused Aderet much trouble and embittered the closing years of his life. He left three sons, Isaac, Judah, and Astruc Solomon, all of whom were learned in the Talmud.

Maimonidean controversy
Aderet defended Maimonides during contemporary debates over his works, and he authorized the translation of Rambam's commentary on the Mishnah from Arabic to Hebrew.

Nevertheless, Aderet was opposed to the philosophic-rationalistic approach to Judaism often associated with Rambam, and he was part of the beth din (rabbinical court) in Barcelona that forbade men younger than 25 from studying secular philosophy or natural science, although an exception was made for those who studied medicine. On July 26, 1305, the Rashba wrote:

"In that city [Barcelona] are those who write iniquity about the Torah and if there would be a heretic writing books, they should be burnt as if they were the book of sorcerers."

Works
Of the works of Solomon ben Aderet there have appeared in print:
 A manual on kashrut (dietary laws) and other religious laws that are observed at home, Torat haBayit haArokh (The Long Law of the House), published at Venice in 1607, at Berlin in 1762, at Vienna in 1811, etc.
 The shorter manual, Torat haBayit haKatzar (The Short Law of the House), published at Cremona in 1565, and at Berlin in 1871. A number of his commentaries and novellae on Talmudic treatises have been printed.
 Mishmeret HaBayit, a defense against Aharon HaLevi's critique of Torat HaBayit.
 Sha'ar HaMayim, a work focusing on the laws of a mikveh (ritual bath).
 Piskei Ḥallah (Decisions on Ḥallah), published at Constantinople in 1518, and at Jerusalem in 1876.
 Avodat haKodesh (The Holy Service), on the laws of Sabbath and festivals, published at Venice in 1602.
 His polemical work against Islam was edited by Perles, as an appendix to the latter's monograph on Aderet.

Talmud commentaries
His commentaries upon seven Talmudic treatises published at Constantinople in 1720, and at Berlin in 1756. Similar disquisitions upon five treatises were published at Venice in 1523 and at Amsterdam in 1715. He wrote besides a number of disquisitions upon single treatises. His Talmud commentaries are now known as Hiddushei HaRashba.

Not all commentaries traditionally attributed to Rashba were actually composed by him. Elchonon Wasserman stated that the commentary on Sukkah attributed to Rashba was actually written by Yom Tov Asevilli, the commentary on Ketubot was actually written by Nachmanides, and the commentary on Menachot was written by an unknown author other than Rashba. Yisrael Meir Kagan suggested that the commentary on Menachot was by Isaiah di Trani, while Israel Joshua Trunk argued that the author was Solomon ben Abraham of Montpellier.

Responsa
Aderet was considered an outstanding rabbinic authority, and more than 3,000 of his responsa are known to be extant. Questions were addressed to him from Spain, Portugal, Italy, France, Germany, and even from Asia Minor. His responsa, which cover the entire gamut of Jewish life, are concise and widely quoted by halakhic authorities.

Aderet's responsa also illustrate his opposition to messianism and prophetic pretensions as a general phenomenon, with examples against Nissim ben Abraham and Abraham Abulafia.

His responsa were printed in Bologna (1539), Venice (1545), Hanau (1610), and other places. The second part of his responsa appeared under the title "Toledot Adam" (The Generations of Man) at Leghorn in 1657, the third part at the same place in 1778, the fourth part at Salonica in 1803, and the fifth part at Leghorn in 1825.

According to Elchonon Wasserman, some responsa attributed to Rashba were actually written by other authors, notably Meir of Rothenburg.

See also
 History of the Jews in Spain

Notes

References

External links

 Video Lecture on Rabbi Shlomo ben Aderet by Dr. Henry Abramson

1235 births
1310 deaths
13th-century Catalan rabbis
14th-century Catalan rabbis
Talmudists
Rabbis from Barcelona
Authors of works on the Talmud
Hebrew-language writers
Authors of books on Jewish law